Eristalinus seychellarum is a species of hoverfly found in the Seychelles. It is black with blue reflections and red and orange striped eyes.

References

Eristalinae
Diptera of Africa
Fauna of Seychelles
Insects described in 1915